Masterpiece is the debut album of reggaeton duo, R.K.M & Ken-Y. The album includes four singles: "Down", "Me Matas", "Dame Lo Que Quiero" and "Igual Que Ayer". The album did fairly well on the charts, peaking number two on the Top Latin Albums chart and number one on the Top Heatseekers charts. It is considered to be one of the top reggaeton albums and made the duo one of the most successful and popular new artists of 2006. As of 2007, the album has sold over 400,000 copies in the United States. It was nominated for a Lo Nuestro Award for Urban Album of the Year.

Track listing

Masterpiece: World Tour (Sold Out) 

On December 12, 2006, a live album was released based on this album. It was based on a concert from Coliseo De Puerto Rico José Miguel Agrelot (English: José Miguel Agrelot Coliseum Of Puerto Rico) in San Juan, Puerto Rico on 	August 18, 2006.

Masterpiece: Commemorative Edition 

On April 3, 2007, the duo released a two disc special edition titled "Masterpiece Commemorative Edition". It was a CD and DVD album with remixes of songs from the standard edition along with a few new songs.

Charts

Album

Singles

Sales and certifications

References

External links 
 Stats of Rakim y Ken-Y's Singles on Billboard
 Stats of Masterpiece on Billboard

2006 debut albums
R.K.M & Ken-Y albums
Pina Records albums